Herbert France Guthrie (29 September 1902 – 26 January 1951) was an Australian sportsman who played first-class cricket for Victoria and Australian rules football with St Kilda in the Victorian Football League (VFL).

Guthrie, who was born in Brisbane, attended Melbourne Grammar as a kid where he played his early football. He appeared in two senior games for St Kilda during the 1925 VFL season, against South Melbourne at Junction Oval and Essendon at Windy Hill.

He also played a couple of first-class cricket matches with Victoria as a right-handed middle order batsman, both at the Melbourne Cricket Ground and with Tasmania at their opponents. His debut performance wasn't memorable but in the second match, during the 1929/30 summer, he made 36 in Victoria's only innings.

See also
 List of Victoria first-class cricketers

References

External links

Cricinfo: Herbert Guthrie

1902 births
1951 deaths
Australian rules footballers from Queensland
Australian rules footballers from Victoria (Australia)
St Kilda Football Club players
Australian cricketers
Victoria cricketers
People educated at Melbourne Grammar School
Cricketers from Brisbane